Kornelia ("Corrie") Winkel (born 26 February 1944) is a former backstroke swimmer from the Netherlands. She finished second in the 100 m backstroke at the 1962 European Aquatics Championships. Two years later she who won the silver medal in the 4×100 m medley relay at the 1964 Summer Olympics. At the same Olympics she finished in 14th position in the individual 100 m backstroke. Between 1962 and 1964 she set eight national and two European records in the 100 m and 200 m backstroke and 4 × 100 m medley events.

References

1944 births
Living people
Olympic swimmers of the Netherlands
Swimmers at the 1964 Summer Olympics
Olympic silver medalists for the Netherlands
Sportspeople from Groningen (city)
Medalists at the 1964 Summer Olympics
Dutch female backstroke swimmers
European Aquatics Championships medalists in swimming
Olympic silver medalists in swimming
20th-century Dutch women